Calybites securinella is a moth of the family Gracillariidae. It is known from the Russian Far East. and Korea.

The larvae feed on Securinega suffruticosa. They probably mine the leaves of their host plant.

References

Gracillariinae
Moths described in 1986